Serhiy Marusyn (born April 1, 1958 in Kanadei, Ulyanovsk Oblast, Soviet Union) is a Ukrainian coach and a former Soviet footballer, the best known for his participation with the Odessa Army Club.

Born in the Volga region, Marusyn was growing up in Dnipropetrovsk.

References

External links
Marusyn gives interview to Odessa-sport.info (October 14, 2010) 

1958 births
Living people
People from Ulyanovsk Oblast
Russian emigrants to Ukraine
Ukrainian footballers
Soviet footballers
SC Odesa players
Ukrainian expatriate footballers
Expatriate footballers in Russia
FC SKA-Lotto Odesa players
FC Dnister Ovidiopol players
FC Tyras-2500 Bilhorod-Dnistrovskyi players
Ukrainian football managers
Soviet football managers
Ukrainian Premier League managers
SC Odesa managers
FC Oleksandriya managers
FC Tyras-2500 Bilhorod-Dnistrovskyi managers
FC Ivan Odesa managers

Association footballers not categorized by position